Justin Time Records is a Canadian record company and independent record label founded in Montreal by Jim West. It was established in 1983 and specialises in jazz and blues.

Although Justin Time initially recorded Canadian musicians such as Oliver Jones, Ranee Lee and Diana Krall, it grew to include Americans such as David Murray and the World Saxophone Quartet. Its catalogue also includes Paul Bley, Jeri Brown, and D. D. Jackson.

Roster

 Susie Arioli
 Hugh Ball/Yank Barry
 Jon Ballantyne
 Billy Bang
 Ed Bickert
 Paul Bley
 Hamiet Bluiett
 Bowser and Blue/Yank Barry
 Trudy Desmond
 Brandi Disterheft
 Hilario Durán
 D.O.A.
 Wray Downes
 Emma Frank
 Sonny Greenwich
 Russell Gunn
 Murray Head
 Thomas Hellman
 Brian Hughes
 D.D. Jackson
 Ingrid Jensen
 Oliver Jones
 Sheila Jordan
 Hilary Kole
 Moe Koffman
 Diana Krall
 Michael Laucke
 Bryan Lee
 Lorne Lofsky
 Halie Loren
 Carmen Lundy
 Curtis Lundy
 Miranie Morissette
 Montreal Jubilation Gospel Choir
 David Murray
 Jordan Officer
 Johnny O'Neal
 Alex Pangman
 P.J. Perry
 Hugh Ragin
 Adam Rudolph
 John Stetch
 Nelson Symonds
 Don Thompson
 Ed Thigpen
 David Virelles
 Oliver Whitehead
 World Saxophone Quartet

References

External links
  Official site

Record labels established in 1983
Canadian independent record labels
Jazz record labels